John Goody Urrea (born February 9, 1955) is a former professional baseball pitcher who played for the St. Louis Cardinals from  to  and the San Diego Padres in .

External links
, or Baseball Reference (Minor and Mexican Leagues), or Retrosheet
Pelota Binaria (Venezuelan Winter League)

1955 births
Living people
[[Category:American base
ball players of Mexican descent]]
American expatriate baseball players in Mexico
Arkansas Travelers players
Baseball players from Los Angeles
Cardenales de Lara players
Venezuelan Professional Baseball League players by team
Gulf Coast Cardinals players
Major League Baseball pitchers
Mexican League baseball pitchers
Petroleros de Poza Rica players
Rio Hondo Roadrunners baseball players
Rojos del Águila de Veracruz players
San Bernardino Pride players
San Diego Padres players
Springfield Cardinals players
St. Louis Cardinals players
St. Petersburg Cardinals players
Tigres del México players